Hawsker was a railway station on the Scarborough & Whitby Railway. It opened on 16 July 1885, and served the villages of High Hawsker, Low Hawsker and Stainsacre. Hawsker was a small intermediate stop and its ticket sales reflected this; it sold only 8,982 tickets in 1922.

The Scarborough & Whitby railway was a victim of the Beeching cuts and all freight traffic to Hawsker was curtailed by 10 August 1964 and the station closed to passengers on 8 March 1965.

The track from Whitby was left in situ until 1973 pending potash traffic which never materialised. The road overbridge immediately south of the station was removed in the 1990s and replaced with a dual pelican crossing.
The station is now (2007) the headquarters of Trailways Cycle Hire and has old railway carriages used as accommodation on site. In the 2010s a brick wing (in a style similar to the rest of the building) was added to the station house's southeast side.

References

External links
 Trailways Cycle Hire (current owners of the station)
 Hawsker station on navigable O. S. map

Disused railway stations in the Borough of Scarborough
Former North Eastern Railway (UK) stations
Beeching closures in England
Railway stations in Great Britain opened in 1885
Railway stations in Great Britain closed in 1965